The 1892 Harvard Crimson football team represented Harvard University in the 1892 college football season. The Crimson finished with a 10–1 record.  The team won its first 10 games by a combined score of 365 to 36, but lost its final game against Yale by a 6–0 score.

Five Harvard players were selected as consensus All-Americans: end Frank Hallowell, tackle Marshall Newell, guard Bert Waters, center William H. Lewis, and fullback Charley Brewer.

Schedule

References

Harvard
Harvard Crimson football seasons
Harvard Crimson football